Zabornia may refer to the following places in Poland:
Zabornia in Gmina Głogów, Głogów County in Lower Silesian Voivodeship (SW Poland)
 Zabornia (Cieszków), a settlement in Cieszków, Milicz County, in Lower Silesian Voivodeship
 Zabornia (Piaski), a settlement in Gmina Piaski, Greater Poland Voivodeship
 Zabornia (Gdańsk), a neighborhood in Gdańsk
 Zabornia (Rabka-Zdrój), part of Rabka-Zdrój